Thomas Epp (born 7 April 1968 in Bietigheim-Bissingen, Baden-Württemberg) is a German former professional footballer who played as a forward.

References

External links
 

1968 births
Living people
People from Bietigheim-Bissingen
Sportspeople from Stuttgart (region)
German footballers
Footballers from Baden-Württemberg
Association football forwards
Germany under-21 international footballers
Bundesliga players
2. Bundesliga players
Cypriot First Division players
VfL Bochum players
1. FC Saarbrücken players
Stuttgarter Kickers players
SV Waldhof Mannheim players
Eintracht Frankfurt players
FC Admira Wacker Mödling players
AEL Limassol players
German expatriate footballers
German expatriate sportspeople in Austria
Expatriate footballers in Austria
German expatriate sportspeople in Cyprus
Expatriate footballers in Cyprus